The Girl and the General is a 1967 Italian anti-war comedy film starring Rod Steiger and Virna Lisi and produced by Carlo Ponti.

Plot
A young woman (Virna Lisi) and a soldier team up to deliver an Austrian General (Rod Steiger) to Italian forces during World War I. Their quest for the 1000 Lire reward changes their lives unexpectedly.

Cast 
 Rod Steiger as The General
 Virna Lisi as Ada
 Umberto Orsini as Pvt. Tarasconi
  Tony Gaggia  as The Lieutenant  
 Marco Mariani  as The Corporal
 Jacques Herlin as The Veterinary 
 Valentino Macchi as Soldier

External links 
 

1967 films
1960s war comedy films
Anti-war comedy films
Italian war comedy films
1960s Italian-language films
Films directed by Pasquale Festa Campanile
Films scored by Ennio Morricone
Anti-war films about World War I
World War I films set on the Italian Front
Films produced by Carlo Ponti
Metro-Goldwyn-Mayer films
1967 comedy films
1960s Italian films